Saluda Grade is the steepest standard-gauge mainline railway grade in the United States. In December 2001, Norfolk Southern took the grade out of service for economic reasons.

History
Captain Charles W. Pearson was assigned to select a route for the Asheville and Spartanburg Railroad to ascend the Blue Ridge front; the area where the rolling hills of the Piedmont end at the foot of the Blue Ridge Mountains. Despite numerous surveys, no route was available for a railroad to ascend the mountains at a tolerable grade, and the best route followed the Pacolet River valley and gorge.

Because of accidents involving downgrade runaway trains in the late 1880s, the then Southern Railway built two runaway safety spur tracks. These were originally manned junctions, which were always switched to a  pile of earth, which could stop downgrade runaway trains.  Only upon hearing a whistle signal from the downgrade train would the signalman manning the spur junction throw the switch to keep the train on the main line.  In later years, CTC signaling was installed along with automated switches and timer circuits for the one surviving runaway safety track at the bottom of the grade at Melrose. Trains running downgrade were required to maintain  when approaching the runaway track switch. This would allow a timer circuit to determine if a train was under control, in which case the switch from the runaway track at Melrose would be aligned to the mainline. But for speed greater than  the switch would remain aligned for the runaway track. Saluda Grade was one of the few grades in the country where uphill trains could travel faster than their downhill counterparts. Most uphill trains had to double or triple the grade, splitting the train into sections to be taken up the grade to Saluda one at a time and reassembled there for the rest of the trip to Asheville.

Norfolk Southern suspended freight traffic between East Flat Rock, North Carolina and Landrum, South Carolina in December 2001, thus ceasing operations on the Saluda Grade. In April 2003, Norfolk Southern severed the line from the rest of its system by placing mounds of dirt over the tracks and disconnecting the rails at mile posts 26 and 45.  The signal system is not in use, and grade crossings have had their arms removed and signals covered. Norfolk Southern has inspected and maintained the right-of-way since placing the segment out of service, removing fallen trees and spraying herbicide on encroaching vegetation, but at least four washouts of the roadbed have occurred between Saluda and South Carolina, rendering the line impassable.

Talks of a passenger train excursion and a Rails-to-trails conversion have made no headway in recent years, and Norfolk Southern states it does not intend to abandon the line. However, in 2014, Norfolk Southern sold a portion of the W Line south of Asheville between mile posts 1 and 26 to Watco, a Class III shortline railroad operator. Watco operates the line as the Blue Ridge Southern Railroad. Norfolk Southern still retains ownership of the out-of-service segment over the Saluda Grade.

On July 20, 2022, Upstate Forever announced its intent to turn the portions of the abandoned Saluda Grade into a rail trail. However, the conversion to a trail was contingent on a purchase agreement from Norfolk Southern. In February 2023, Norfolk Southern agreed to sell 31 miles of the Saluda Grade to another group planning a trail, The Saluda Grade Trail Conservancy.

See also
List of steepest gradients on adhesion railways
Reuben Wells

References

Bibliography

Further reading

External links
 Saluda Historic Depot - Official website

Southern Railway (U.S.)
Norfolk Southern Railway
Rail infrastructure in North Carolina
Railway inclines in the United States